Willy Kambwala Ndengushi (born 25 August 2004) is a professional footballer currently playing as a centre-back for Manchester United. Born in the Democratic Republic of the Congo, Kambwala has represented France at youth international level.

Club career

Early career
Born in Kinshasa, Democratic Republic of the Congo, Kambwala and his family moved to France when he was five. He was raised in Les Ulis, Essonne, and started his career with Elan Chevilly Larue and Les Ulis, before joining the academy of Sochaux in 2018.

Manchester United
Kambwala was linked with a move to English sides Liverpool and Manchester United in July 2020. He made the move to Manchester United in October 2020, signing on transfer deadline day. He suffered an eleven-month injury layoff only weeks into his spell in Manchester, returning to action in September 2021, playing in an 8–2 away win against Birmingham City's under-18 team. He signed a professional contract with Manchester United the following month.

International career
Kambwala captained France at under-16 level. He is also eligible to represent the Democratic Republic of the Congo.

References

External links
 

2004 births
Living people
Footballers from Kinshasa
Democratic Republic of the Congo footballers
French footballers
France youth international footballers
Association football defenders
CO Les Ulis players
FC Sochaux-Montbéliard players
Manchester United F.C. players
Democratic Republic of the Congo expatriate footballers
Democratic Republic of the Congo expatriate sportspeople in England
French expatriate footballers
French expatriate sportspeople in England
Expatriate footballers in England